(11August 177815October 1852) was a German gymnastics educator and nationalist whose writing is credited with the founding of the German gymnastics (Turner) movement as well as influencing the German Campaign of 1813, during which a coalition of German states effectively ended the occupation of Napoleon's First French Empire.

Life 
After the Battle of Jena–Auerstedt in 1806, he joined the Prussian army.

Brooding upon what he saw as the humiliation of his native land by Napoleon,  conceived the idea of restoring the spirits of his countrymen by the development of their physical and moral powers through the practice of gymnastics. Young gymnasts were taught to regard themselves as members of a kind of guild for the emancipation of their fatherland.

In early 1813  took an active part in the formation of the famous Lützow Free Corps, a volunteer force in the Prussian army fighting Napoleon. He commanded a battalion of the corps, but he was often employed in the secret service during the same period.

A man of a populistic nature, rugged, eccentric and outspoken,  often came into conflict with the authorities. The authorities finally realized he aimed at establishing a united Germany and that his  schools were political and liberal clubs. The sentence was reversed in 1825, but he was forbidden to live within ten miles of Berlin.

In 1840,  was decorated by the Prussian government with the Iron Cross for bravery in the wars against Napoleon. In the spring of 1848, he was elected by the district of Naumburg to the German National Parliament.  died in 1852 in Freyburg, where a monument was erected in his honor in 1859.

 popularized the four Fs motto ", " ("fresh, pious, cheerful, free") in the early 19th century.

Works

Among his works are the following: 
 (1806), 
 (1810), 
 (Frankfurt, 1814),
 (Berlin, 1816) 
 (Naumburg, 1828), 
 (1833), and 
 (1863). 

Contribution to physical education 

 promoted the use of parallel bars, rings and the high bar in international competition.

Gymnastics classes inspired by   design started opening in the United States in 1825 under the expertise and advocacy of Germans Charles Beck and Charles Follen, as well as American John Neal. Beck opened the first gymnasium in the US in 1825 at the Round Hill School in Northampton, Massachusetts. Follen opened the first college gymnasium and the first public gymnasium in the US in Massachusetts in 1826 at Harvard College and in nearby Boston, respectively. Neal was the first American to open a public gymnasium in the US in Portland, Maine in 1827. During this period, Neal spread  concepts in the US in the American Journal of Education and The Yankee, helping to establish the American branch of the movement.

A memorial to  exists in St. Louis, Missouri, within its Forest Park. The monument is on the edge of Art Hill next to the path running north and south along the western edge of Post-Dispatch Lake. It is directly north of the St. Louis Zoo. On the plaque below his bronze bust,  is given credit as "The Father of Systematic Physical Culture".

An elementary school in Chicago, is named after .

Criticism 

In his own time  was seen by both supporters and opponents as a liberal figure. He advocated that the German states should unite after the withdrawal of Napoleon's occupying armies and establish a democratic constitution under the  monarchy, which would include the right to free speech. As a German nationalist,  advocated maintaining German language and culture against foreign influence. In 1810 he wrote, "Poles, French, priests, aristocrats and Jews are Germany's misfortune." At the time  wrote this, the German states were occupied by foreign armies under the leadership of Napoleon. Also,  was "the guiding spirit" of the fanatic book burning episode carried out by revolutionary students at the Wartburg festival in 1817.

The equation by the National Socialists of  ideas with their world view was more or less complete by the mid-1930s.

 gained infamy in English-speaking countries following the publication of  Metapolitics: The Roots of the Nazi Mind (1941).  claimed  was the spiritual founder of Nazism who inspired early German romantics with anti-Semitic and authoritarian doctrines, influencing  and finally, the Nazis. However,  observed that  portrait of cultural trends supposedly leading to Nazism was "a caricature without resemblance" relying on "misleading shortcuts", though  response in the same issue points out that it is clear from  remarks that  did not read far into the book.

See also
Turners

Notes

References

Further reading

External links

Early Climbing Activities in Gymnastics
Forest Park Monument1
Forest Park Monument 2

Open Library

1778 births
1852 deaths
People associated with physical culture
People from Prignitz
Freikorps personnel of the Napoleonic Wars 
German gymnasts 
19th-century German educators
History of gymnastics
Prussian Army personnel of the Napoleonic Wars
People from the Margraviate of Brandenburg 
University of Greifswald alumni
Members of the Frankfurt Parliament
German nationalists
German prisoners and detainees